The Fourth Reich is the theoretical future successor of the german Third Reich.

Fourth Reich may also refer to:
The Fourth Reich (film), a 1990 South African film
 The Fourth Reich (EP), a 1982 EP by the Icelandic group Þeyr
 "4th Reich", a song by the band Stratovarius from their 1994 album Dreamspace
 The Fourth Reich, within the New World Order conspiracy theory
 Fourth Reich (New Zealand gang)